Sonaguera Football Club is a Honduran soccer club based in Sonaguera, Department of Colón, Honduras.

History
The club played in the Honduran second division but were relegated in summer 2013 after being beaten by Olimpia Occidental in a relegation play-off.

See also
 Season 09/10

References

Football clubs in Honduras